Orobinsky is a rural locality (a khutor) in Derezovskoye Rural Settlement, Verkhnemamonsky District, Voronezh Oblast, Russia. The population was 174 as of 2010. There are 3 streets.

Geography 
Orobinsky is located 40 km southwest of Verkhny Mamon (the district's administrative centre) by road. Derezovka is the nearest rural locality.

References 

Rural localities in Verkhnemamonsky District